The Commons Registration Act 1965 is an Act of Parliament in the United Kingdom enacted in 1965 that concerns the registration of rights to common land, town greens, and village greens in England and Wales. The legislation under the Harold Wilson government made reference to the Land Registration Act 1925 and Land Registration Act 1936.

The Countryside and Rights of Way Act 2000 and the Commons Act 2006, which gave new opportunities to register greens, amended the act.

Registrations and Losses
In the late 1960s, following the enactment of the Commons Registration Act 1965, the Open Spaces Society worked hard to register common land and common rights, in the three years allowed by the Act. However, still many commons were lost through failure to register them. The Act has reduced the historical rights of households that did not register under the Act. For example, villages in Wolvercote north of Oxford used to have grazing rights on Wolvercote Common. However, since the Act came into force, only those households that registered under the Act now have this right.

Several hundred square kilometres of ‘waste land’ that was eligible for registration under the 1965 Commons Registration Act was not, in fact, finally registered. As a consequence, it ceased to be recognised as common land. A partial remedy for this defect in the earlier legislation is provided by the Commons Act 2006. Under Schedule 2, 4 of the Act, applications that failed under the original registration process may, in certain circumstances, be reconsidered – offering, in effect, a second chance for the land to be confirmed (‘re-registered’) as common. Land that is re-registered in this way will enjoy the special legal protection afforded to common land. It will also be subject to the public right of access introduced by the Countryside and Rights of Way Act 2000; or, may qualify as a section 193 ‘urban’ common (in which case, it would also be subject to a right of access for horse-riders).

See also
The common land and commoners of Ashdown Forest
English land law
List of Acts of the Parliament of the United Kingdom, 1960–1979
Public service law in the United Kingdom

References

1965 establishments in England
1965 establishments in Wales
United Kingdom Acts of Parliament 1965
Acts of the Parliament of the United Kingdom concerning England and Wales
English property law
Common land in the United Kingdom
Common land in England